Desiya was a dance- and house-music project that was fronted by the DJ-remixer-producer Matthew Parkhouse from New York and featured Melissa Yiannakou (now De Sa) on vocals. Its 1992 #1 hit on the US Billboard Hot Dance Music/Club Play chart, "Comin' on Strong," was released by Mute/Elektra Records and featured remixes by Tony Humphries, Larry Heard, and Masters at Work. It peaked at #74 in the UK Singles Chart in February 1992.

References

External links
Desiya at Discogs

American dance music groups
American house music groups
Electronic music groups from New York (state)
Mute Records artists